Eurythenes is a genus of marine amphipods in the family Eurytheneidae.

Species
E. aequilatus  Narahara-Nakano, Nakano & Tomikawa, 2017
E. andhakarae  d'Udekem d'Acoz & Havermans, 2015
E. atacamensis Weston & Espinosa-Leal, 2021
E. gryllus Lichtenstein in Mandt, 1822
E. magellanicus H. Milne Edwards, 1848
E. maldoror d'Udekem d'Acoz & Havermans, 2015
E. obesus Chevreux, 1905
E. plasticus Weston, 2020
E. sigmiferus d'Udekem d'Acoz & Havermans, 2015
E. thurstoni Stoddart & Lowry, 2004

References

 
Crustacean genera